"Shut 'Em Down" is a single by LL Cool J from the soundtrack to the movie Any Given Sunday. The single was released on January 4, 2000 for Atlantic Records and was produced by DJ Scratch. The track peaked at #31 on Billboard's Hot Rap Singles chart and #88 on the Hot R&B/Hip-Hop Songs charts. Six versions of the song appeared on the single.

Track listing

A-Side
"Shut 'Em Down" (Radio Mix)
"Shut 'Em Down" (Video Mix)
"Shut 'Em Down" (Clean Acapella)

B-Side
"Shut 'Em Down" (LP Version)
"Shut 'Em Down" (Instrumental)
"Shut 'Em Down" (Acapella)

References

2000 singles
LL Cool J songs
Songs written by LL Cool J
2000 songs
Atlantic Records singles